is a Japanese former professional baseball infielder and pitcher. He played for the Chunichi Dragons and Chiba Lotte Marines.

He has been a coach since 1998 being on the payroll of his former club  the Chunichi Dragons and the Tohoku Rakuten Golden Eagles.

On 25 September 2019, Nimura was invited to fill the role of farm team manager with his former team, the Chunichi Dragons. On 28 September, Nimura was officially unveiled as the second team manager for the 2020 Western League season.

External links

References

1961 births
Living people
Baseball people from Saitama Prefecture
Japanese baseball players
Nippon Professional Baseball infielders
Chunichi Dragons players
Chiba Lotte Marines players
Japanese baseball coaches
Nippon Professional Baseball coaches